Małachowo-Złych Miejsc  is a village in the administrative district of Gmina Witkowo, within Gniezno County, Greater Poland Voivodeship, in west-central Poland.

Małachowo-Złych Miejsc, historically also known as Małachowo-Złych Mięsic, was a private village of Polish nobility, administratively located in the Gniezno County in the Kalisz Voivodeship in the Greater Poland Province of the Polish Crown.

References

Villages in Gniezno County